Kongo is a town in the Upper East Region of Ghana. The town is known for the Kongo Secondary School.  The school is a second cycle institution.

References

Populated places in the Upper East Region